Robert James "Bob" Conrad Jr. (born May 17, 1958) is a United States district judge of the United States District Court for the Western District of North Carolina.  He was the District's former Chief Judge (2006–2013) and a former nominee to the United States Court of Appeals for the Fourth Circuit to take the place of the retired James Dickson Phillips Jr.  He is a former member of the Executive Committee of the Judicial Conference of the United States (2016–2020).

Conrad graduated from Clemson University with a Bachelor of Arts degree in 1980. He received Clemson’s coveted “Norris Medal” as the outstanding undergraduate student, as well as being awarded the Atlantic Coast Conference’s “Jim Weaver” Postgraduate Scholarship as the ACC’s top all-around student athlete regardless of which sport.  He attended the University of Virginia School of Law and earned  a Juris Doctor in 1983.

Early life
Conrad was born on May 17, 1958 into an Irish-Catholic family and grew up on the west side of Chicago, Illinois. The Conrad family moved to Glen Ellyn, Illinois in 1967 where he was raised. He graduated from St. Petronille Elementary School in 1972, and Benet Academy High School in Lisle, Illinois in 1976.

Conrad later graduated from Clemson University with a Bachelor of Arts degree in 1980 and the University of Virginia School of Law with a Juris Doctor in 1983.

Athletic career
Judge Conrad was born into a sports driven family.  His father played Division I basketball at Loyola University New Orleans and competed in the NCAA tournament.  He (1976) and his brother Kevin (1979) were named members of the Chicago Tribune Golden Basketball Team as one of the top high school basketball players in the Chicago area. Both went on to become Hall of Fame collegiate players at Clemson University and Dayton University respectively.  Both were part of a Benet Academy High School basketball home court winning streak of over 100 consecutive games.  Two of Conrad’s sons would play college basketball, Branden at the University of South Carolina and Ryan at Belmont Abbey College.

In college, he was "the point guard in 1980 for what many consider Clemson's best basketball team ever.  He was one of seven players who received votes for the Atlantic Coast Conference Men's Basketball Player of the Year Award in 1979.  Conrad finished his career ranked first in single season steals, second in career steals, first in single season and career charges taken, and second in single season and career assists.  In 1980 he led his team in free throw percentage.  He was most well-known for making 8-8 free throws in overtime in Clemson’s upset win against undefeated and No. 1 ranked Duke University.

Conrad was named a “Legend of the ACC”, was listed as  one of the 25 Best Players of the First 100 Years of Clemson Basketball, became an Academic All-American, and was the inaugural  recipient of Clemson’s “Bond” Ring as a Distinguished Athletic Alumnus.

Legal career

Conrad's legal career has included stints with Michie Hamlett Donato & Lowry in Charlottesville, Virginia(1983–1986), Horn & Conrad (1986–1987), and Bush Thurman & Conrad (1987–1989). before becoming an Assistant United States Attorney (1989–2001) In 2001, he became the United States Attorney for the Western District of North Carolina (2001–2004).  He was a partner with Mayer Brown (2004—2005) and became a federal district court judge in June 2005.

US Attorney
Conrad served as an Assistant United States Attorney for the Western District of North Carolina from 1989 to 2001.

In 1999, Attorney General Janet Reno selected him to serve as Chief of the Campaign Financing Task Force ("CFTF"), investigating alleged illegal campaign contributions to both parties during the 1996 Presidential election.  In making the selection, AG Reno said “Bob is one of the most respected career prosecutors in the Department of Justice.”

Conrad led a team of career prosecutors and obtained convictions against James Riady, Pauline Kanchanalak, Maria Hsia, among thirty others. In pleading guilty, Riady on behalf of Lippo Bank agreed to pay $8.6 million, “the largest fine ever imposed for violation of the campaign finance laws."  As part of those duties Conrad deposed the President and Vice-President of the United States in the same week.  As Chief of the CFTF, he was later named Acting U.S. Attorney for New Jersey responsible for investigating and prosecuting alleged campaign financing violations related to the 1996 Torricelli for Senate Campaign.  He formally recommended that an independent counsel be named to investigate then Vice President Al Gore for perjury.

After this assignment, an article in The Washington Post stated that Conrad was ”uniformly described by people who know him as a fair minded, career prosecutor who doesn't let politics interfere with his work.”  At the end of his service as Chief of the CFTF, Reno said “Bob Conrad has done an outstanding job leading the Campaign Financing Task Force for the past year.”  Defense Attorney George Laughrun described him as “one of the most ethical lawyers I know.”  Another defense attorney described Conrad as “a tough minded but fair prosecutor who is scrupulously honest.”

Conrad was promoted to United States Attorney in the same district from 2001 until 2004.  During the Bush Administration, Attorney General John Ashcroft appointed Conrad to the Attorney General's Advisory Committee as Vice Chair of the Advisory Committee on Terrorism along with Patrick Fitzgerald, and also appointed Conrad Chair of the Committee on Violent Crime.

Conrad's office was instrumental in prosecuting supporters of the Hezbollah terrorist cell in North Carolina.  Conrad also prosecuted violent intimidation, including at least one cross-burning case, during which Conrad stated: “Race-motivated, cross-burning conduct is anathema to a civilized society.  We are gratified that the Fourth Circuit Court of Appeals rejected the notion that such conduct can be provoked.”

Governor Roy Cooper, then the North Carolina Attorney General, said that Conrad had ““the qualities that you wanted not only in a U.S. attorney but as a judge. He has a moral compass. He is a person of faith who knows right from wrong. He has integrity. And he respects and honors the rule of law.”

Federal Judicial Service
Conrad was nominated by President George W. Bush to the United States District Court for the Western District of North Carolina on February 14, 2005, to a new seat authorized by 116 Stat. 1758. He was confirmed on April 28, 2005. He received his judicial commission on June 2, 2005. He became Chief Judge of the district in 2006 and served in that capacity until 2013.

Conrad was elected by his peers and appointed by Chief Justice Roberts to a position on the Judicial Conference of the United States.  He chaired the District Court Representatives group of that Judicial Conference in 2020.  From 2016 to 2020, he served on the Executive Committee of the Judicial Conference.  He also chaired the COVID-19 Task Force on Reconstituting the Jury Trial.  Conrad currently serves on the Judicial Conference Advisory Committee on Criminal Rules, where he is a liaison to the Evidence Rules Advisory Committee.

While a judge on the bench of the Western District of North Carolina, Conrad was involved in the local and state bar serving as Vice-President of the N.C. Bar Association (2011–12), member and Chair of the Memorials Committee of the Mecklenburg County Bar (2015–2021), and member of the Ayscue Professionalism Committee of that bar association (2019–2021).

Noteworthy Judicial Cases
In April 2010, six alleged members of the gang MS-13 were tried before Judge Conrad in two separate trials.  In the first case, six defendants were tried on forty criminal charges, including three defendants who were alleged to be responsible for the deaths of four people.  Sixty witnesses testified in the case, of whom three entered witness protection.  The jury found the six defendants guilty on thirty six counts.  In the second trial MS-13 gang member Alejandro Enrique Ramirez Umaña was charged with murder after he allegedly killed two brothers who “disrespected” him in a restaurant.  Umaña attempted to bring a knife into the courtroom, and he allegedly attempted to kill witnesses and informants while he was awaiting trial.  A jury convicted Umaña of murder and voted unanimously to impose the death penalty.

In September 2010, Judge Conrad sat by designation on a panel of the Fourth Circuit that heard the appeal of Derek Tice, one of the “Norfolk Four” who had been convicted for a 1997 rape and murder.  Following his conviction another man, Omar Ballard, confessed to committing the crime and had his DNA matched to the crime scene.  The panel affirmed that Tice was entitled to a writ of habeas corpus and that his conviction should be overturned.

In July 2011 Judge Conrad presided over a trial involving a lawsuit against TASER International Inc. for the wrongful death of a minor.  When 17-year-old Darryl Green was killed after being struck in the chest and shocked by a TASER product in a North Carolina supermarket in March 2008, the jury in the case found a $10 million judgment against the TASER company.  Judge Conrad reduced the amount to $5.49 million in light of the “relatively thin” evidence and prior settlements in the case.  However, the Fourth Circuit determined that the amount needed to be reduced even further because the Plaintiff had not sufficiently proven specific damages.

In September 2011 Judge Conrad issued an order prohibiting the US Airways pilots union from cancelling or delaying flights in their effort to force US Airways into contract negotiations. Judge Conrad ordered the US Airline Pilots Association to refrain from "instigating, authorizing or encouraging" the interference with US Airways operations and instructed pilots to resume their normal schedules and work practices.

In 2014 Conrad expressed frustration at the mandatory minimum sentencing laws that required him to sentence Corvain Cooper, a 34-year-old black man, to life in prison for money laundering, tax evasion, and conspiracy to sell marijuana.  Conrad stated at sentencing that he was “not comfortable with imposing a mandatory minimum life sentence on a 34-year-old individual without some discretion” to consider sentence-reducing factors, but stated that the law tied the Court’s hands.  Conrad had previously spoken out against such mandatory minimum sentence laws, testifying at a February 2009 Sentencing Commission Public Hearing that “ultimately the goal of uniformity must yield to the imperative of doing justice in individual cases.”  After President Barack Obama declined to issue a pardon in Cooper’s case, President Donald Trump commuted Corvain Cooper’s sentence in January 2021.

Failed Nomination to Court of Appeals 
On July 17, 2007, Judge Conrad was nominated by President George W. Bush to a seat on the United States Court of Appeals for the Fourth Circuit vacated by Judge James Dickson Phillips Jr. in 1994.  Conrad was nominated in the place of the prior candidate Terrence Boyle.

Although he had the support of North Carolina's two Republican senators, Elizabeth Dole and Richard Burr, Judge Conrad ran into immediate opposition from Senate Democrats and liberal groups such as People for the American Way and the Alliance for Justice. These groups expressed concerns over both Conrad's writings prior to his confirmation as a district court judge and his rulings later as a judge.

Conrad had referred to Planned Parenthood's OB/GYNs as "abortionists" in 1988. He also wrote that "Planned Parenthood knowingly kills unborn babies, not fetuses, as a method of post conception contraception." Additionally, he claimed that Planned Parenthood had done nothing to reduce teen pregnancy rates and should not receive funding for its contraception services. In 1999, Conrad wrote "Habitually Wrong" which was published in the Catholic Dossier. In it, he heavily criticized Sister Helen Prejean's book Dead Man Walking. He referred to the book as "liberal drivel" and to Sister Prejean as a "Church-hating nun." He contended that, "This surprisingly shallow book wallows in worn-out liberal shibboleths and dated anecdotes."

Senator Patrick Leahy D-VT, the Democratic chairman of the Senate Judiciary Committee, used Judge Conrad's comments on Prejean to justify why he refused to schedule a hearing for Conrad. He said that Conrad was "anti-Catholic", which enraged Senate Republicans. The Republicans countered that Conrad, himself a Catholic, had merely criticized Prejean for "the near total contempt [she] displayed for the Roman Catholic Church."  In short, Conrad was defending the Catholic Church from the anti-Catholic comments he believed the nun to have made.

Separately, People for the American Way argued that Judge Conrad's short tenure on the district court had not served to put to rest the concerns raised by his pre-judicial record. To the contrary, this activist group stated that he "'consistently ruled against plaintiffs alleging employment discrimination,' he appear[ed] hostile to the rights of criminal defendants, and, sitting by designation on the Fourth Circuit, he joined an anti-environmental ruling overturning a district court decision that the Army Corps of Engineers had violated the Clean Water Act in approving a permit for the discharge of material from mountain-top mining."

Supporters of Judge Conrad responded by citing Judge Conrad’s life-long commitment to public service, the support of both home state Senators, his well-qualified ABA rating, and the fact that the Senate had  unanimously confirmed him twice before (as U.S. Attorney and United States District Court Judge) as evidence to belie any concerns mounted by these opposition groups.  His advocates also noted Attorney General Reno’s commendation of Conrad as “one of the most respected career prosecutors in the Department of Justice.”

Nonetheless, Conrad would never get a hearing in the Democratic-controlled Senate, and his nomination lapsed with the end of the Bush administration.  President Barack Obama chose to nominate James A. Wynn Jr. to the seat in 2009.

Advocacy Teacher
Judge Conrad has shown a commitment to excellence in trial advocacy.  He has been a member of the faculty of the National Trial Advocacy College at the University of Virginia School of Law,—"the country's premier trial advocacy program for lawyers"—since 2000.

In 2015, Judge Conrad received the prestigious William J. Brennan Award from the National Trial Advocacy College. The Brennan Award was established in 1987, with Justice Brennan's unsurpassed contributions to the United States legal system and, in particular, to the enhancement of trial advocacy skills. The honorees – judges, public officials, and private practitioners – are selected on the basis of 1) their outstanding skills as trial lawyers and members of the judiciary, and 2) their outstanding contributions to advocacy education and to the legal profession.

Conrad also is an adjunct professor at Wake Forest School of Law, and teaches trial advocacy at the National Advocacy Center in Columbia, SC.

Conrad has expressed a particular interest in jury trials. He has authored several articles including "The Vanishing Criminal Jury Trial: From Trial Judges to Sentencing Judges," "Jury Trials in a Pandemic Age," and "Judging a Book: Conrad Reviews 'The Jury Crisis.'"

Virginia Revival Model Courtroom

Conrad is the foremost proponent of a courtroom design concept known as the Virginia Revival Model or VRM. The principal features of this courtroom design, adopted from the customary eighteenth century Commonwealth of Virginia county courthouse, is a center-based (rather than a side-based) jury box, with jurors positioned underneath the judge looking out toward the witness and gallery, the witness box placed in the center of the well directly facing the jury and judge, and with counsel tables on each side of the witness box.  Conrad has argued that this design puts the jury in the center of the trial and allows them to better see the witness’ face, enhancing the jury’s ability to gauge the witness’ credibility and assisting the jury’s role as fact-finders.

In 2021, the newly constructed wing of the Charles R. Jonas Courthouse in Charlotte, NC features a Virginia Revival Model courtroom, marking the first time such a courtroom has been constructed outside the Commonwealth of Virginia.

Community Involvement

Judge Conrad has served for years as a volunteer youth basketball coach for both boys and girls.

Conrad is known to invest in young people, including former gang members he once prosecuted.  Brian Mack, a former member of a violent gang, testified at Judge Conrad’s judicial investiture: “from the day I was released from prison, he contacted me to make sure that I stayed in the right path. He's been more than a mentor to me. He's been a friend.”

Conrad also serves on the Board of Trustees of Belmont Abbey College where he is a member of the Executive Committee and Chair of the Student Experience Committee.

Personal life
Conrad is Catholic. He and his wife Ann have five children and the grandparents of ten grandchildren.

Book
In 2021, Conrad published John Fisher and Thomas More: Keeping Their Souls While Losing Their Heads (2021), recounting the stories of Bishop John Fisher and Thomas More, who were executed by King Henry VIII.  In Conrad's account, “[More and Fisher] were not adamantine followers of self-will but servants of the one true God who spoke through his Word and his Church.  Their shared conviction was that... God was truth, and that his Church was a truth-telling institution.”

See also
George W. Bush judicial appointment controversies

References

External links

1958 births
Living people
Assistant United States Attorneys
Clemson University alumni
University of Virginia School of Law alumni
Judges of the United States District Court for the Western District of North Carolina
United States district court judges appointed by George W. Bush
21st-century American judges
United States Attorneys for the Western District of North Carolina
Lawyers from Chicago